The 1934 Loyola Lions football team was an American football team that represented Loyola University of Los Angeles (now known as Loyola Marymount University) as an independent during the 1934 college football season. In their fifth season under head coach Tom Lieb, the Lions compiled a 7–2–1 record, shut out five of ten opponents, and outscored opponents by a total of 179 to 44.

Schedule

References

Loyola
Loyola Lions football seasons
Loyola Lions football